Sizwe Mpofu-Walsh (born 4 January 1989) is a South African author, musician and activist. Mpofu-Walsh was president of the University of Cape Town Students' Representative Council in 2010. He holds a DPhil in International Relations from the University of Oxford. In September 2017, Mpofu-Walsh published his debut book, Democracy and Delusion: 10 Myths in South African Politics. Along with the book, he released his debut rap album, also titled Democracy and Delusion.

Early life
Mpofu-Walsh was born in Johannesburg, the son of a black father and a white mother. His parents were politically active in the struggle against apartheid. His father is Dali Mpofu a prominent advocate, former SABC CEO and Chairperson of the Economic Freedom Fighters political party. He attended Sacred Heart College and St John's College. He was part of the hip-hop group Entity, along with rapper AKA and Nhlanhla Makenna. He played for the Orlando Pirates Youth Academy between the ages of 13 and 16 . Mpofu-Walsh spent a year living in the rural Eastern Cape village of Qugqwala, before undergoing ritual Xhosa initiation in 2007 .

Mpofu-Walsh attended the University of Cape Town, earning an Honours degree in Politics Philosophy and Economics in 2012. He was SRC President in 2010, where his SRC was the first to successfully challenge the university's proposed fees increase, reducing it from 12% to 8% . At UCT, he co-founded InkuluFreeHeid, a youth-led civil society organisation. He earned a Weidenfeld Scholarship to pursue a master's degree in International Relations at the University of Oxford, which he earned in 2015. He completed his doctorate in international relations in 2020 at Oxford, with a dissertation on the politics of nuclear-weapon-free zones.

Writing and public career
Mpofu-Walsh released a song called "Mr President", criticising then South African President Jacob Zuma for corruption in 2013. The song was featured in the Wall Street Journal. That year, the Mail and Guardian named him as one of the 200 top young South Africans.

He has written on the subjects of racism and corruption for South African newspaper City Press. In 2014, his article called "SA's Three-Way Split" predicted that South African politics would split into three poles.

Mpofu-Walsh has been a vocal supporter of free education in South Africa. He published a chapter on a possible free education model in the book Fees Must Fall: Student Revolt, Decolonisation and Governance, published by Wits University Press. 
Mpofu-Walsh was also part of the Rhodes Must Fall in Oxford campaign, which aimed to highlight alleged institutional racism at Oxford and called for a statue of Cecil Rhodes located on the Oxford High Street to be relocated. Mpofu-Walsh was quoted as saying:"There is something deeply wrong with the way Oxford presents itself, with the way it has biases against people and we are raising that and for the first time we are forcing the university to confront that problem and probably doing a better job than any generation before us." The campaign was unsuccessful at the time, and was opposed by university academics and anti-apartheid activists including Nigel Biggar, Mary Beard and Denis Goldberg. It was supported by prominent academic Noam Chomsky. 

Mpofu-Walsh won the City Press-Tafelberg Award for promising non-fiction for his book Democracy and Delusion: 10 Myths in South African Politics, published in September, 2017.

Mpofu-Walsh's second book, The New Apartheid, was published in July 2021. In it he argues that "Apartheid did not die; it was privatised".

Bibliography
 Democracy and Delusion: 10 Myths in South African Politics (2017)
 The New Apartheid (2021)

Discography
 Democracy and Delusion (2017)

References

External links
 Sizwe Mpofu-Walsh on Goodreads

1989 births
Living people
Alumni of the University of Oxford
Alumni of St John's College (Johannesburg)
People from Johannesburg
Political writers
South African activists
South African male writers
South African musicians
University of Cape Town alumni